Tīna Siliņa (born 10 January 1995 in Ventspils) is a Latvian curler from Jelgava. She is currently the alternate for the Latvian National Women's Curling Team.

Career
At the national level, she is a three-time Latvian junior champion (2012, 2015, 2016). Siliņa competed in her first European Curling Championships in 2018 at the 2018 European Curling Championships. The team had an impressive performance, finishing with a 4–5 record in the A Division including defeating higher-ranked Scotland's Eve Muirhead. This qualified them for the 2019 World Women's Curling Championship. There, the team struggled, finishing in last place with a 1–11 record.

Teams

References

External links
 
 
 
 
 Video: 

Living people
1995 births
People from Ventspils
Latvian female curlers
Latvian curling champions
21st-century Latvian women